The solar park Telangana II is at Palwai village near Gadwal in the Mahbubnagar district of Telangana. It is a 12 megawatt (MWDC) photovoltaic power station, commissioned in June 2016. It is in direct neighbourhood to its sister project Telangana I. Telangana II was constructed using 38,430 solar modules. The estimated reduction of CO2 is more than 8,000 metric tons per year.

Owner of the power plant is Solar Arise India Projects Limited, which the shareholders are Thomas Lloyd Group, the European Initiative on Clean, Renewable Energy, Energy Efficiency and Climate Change related to Development SICAV SIF in relation to Global Energy Efficiency and Renewable Energy Fund (“GEEREF”), advised by the European Investment Bank Group, Kotak Mahindra managed Core Infrastructure India Fund (“CIIF”) and the founding management team Anil Nayar, James Abraham and Tanya Singhal. Solar Arise currently owns and operates 130 MW of grid-connected solar power projects in India. The park is operated by Talettutayi Solar Projects Six Private Limited.

The state of telangana has started its “Telangana Solar Power Policy” in 2015 to create "an enabling environment for prospective solar power developers".

References

External links
 https://www.thomas-lloyd.com/en/portfolio-item/telangana-ii/

Photovoltaic power stations in India
Mahbubnagar district
2016 establishments in Telangana
Power stations in Telangana